William Ross (born July 20, 1948) is an American composer, orchestrator, arranger, conductor and music director. Ross is the recipient of three Primetime Emmy Awards (in 2007 and 2009), one Daytime Emmy Award (in 1991), and has been nominated for one Annie Award (in 2008). He has been nominated twice for the Grammy Award for Best Instrumental Arrangement Accompanying Vocalist(s).

Ross is the arranger for Andrea Bocelli's version of Amazing Grace performed during his concert "Andrea Bocelli: Music For Hope - Live From Duomo di Milano", broadcast live on YouTube to over 25 million viewers on April 12, 2020.

Ross has worked with artists and musicians ranging from Hollywood composers John Williams, Alan Silvestri, John Powell, Michael Giacchino, Klaus Badelt, and Michael Kamen, to pop music artists including Barbra Streisand, Celine Dion, Andrea Bocelli, Josh Groban, Laura Pausini, Whitney Houston, Kenny G, Michael Jackson, David Foster, Quincy Jones, Babyface and Sting. He has also arranged the music for multiple Olympic Games opening and closing ceremonies from 1998 to 2010.

Ross composed the soundtrack for films such as Tuck Everlasting, My Dog Skip, Young Black Stallion and Ladder 49.  He adapted and conducted John Williams's themes for Harry Potter and the Chamber of Secrets. In 2008, he scored the CGI-film The Tale of Despereaux, from Universal Studios.

Ross is the Music Director for many shows and artists, including Barbra Streisand's 2006 US tour and 2007 European tour, as well as the 79th, 83rd, 85th and 86th Academy Awards. Ross regularly arranges and conducts the Academy Awards at the Dolby Theatre, overseeing all music cues throughout the broadcast.

William Ross is credited on The Last Jedi soundtrack as an additional conductor. His work is featured on the Universal Orlando theme park ride Skull Island: Reign of Kong.

Ross also adapted John Williams' main theme for the end credits of the Obi-Wan Kenobi show on Disney+.

Filmography

As composer

Awards

Emmy Awards

Grammy Awards

BMI Film & TV Awards

Online Film & Television Association Awards

International Film Music Critics Awards 
Ross was nominated in 2012 for "Best Original Score for a Comedy Film" at the IFMCA Awards for his scoring work on "A Very Harold & Kumar 3D Christmas".

Annie Awards 
Ross was nominated in 2009 for "Best Music in an Animated Feature Production" at the Annie Awards for his scoring work on "The Tale of Despereaux".

Gemini Awards 
Ross was nominated in 1993 for "Best Original Music Score for a Program or Mini-Series" at the Gemini Awards for his scoring work on "Golden Fiddles".

References

External links
 William Ross' Official Website
 

1948 births
Living people
20th-century American composers
20th-century American conductors (music)
20th-century American male musicians
American film score composers
American music arrangers
American male conductors (music)
American male film score composers
Animation composers
Place of birth missing (living people)